A seaplane is a powered fixed-wing aircraft capable of taking off and landing (alighting) on water. Seaplanes are usually divided into two categories based on their technological characteristics: floatplanes and flying boats; the latter are generally far larger and can carry far more. Seaplanes that can also take off and land on airfields are in a subclass called amphibious aircraft, or amphibians.  Seaplanes were sometimes called hydroplanes, but currently this term applies instead to motor-powered watercraft that use the technique of hydrodynamic lift to skim the surface of water when running at speed.

The use of seaplanes gradually tapered off after World War II, partially because of the investments in airports during the war but mainly because landplanes were less constrained by weather conditions that could result in sea states being too high to operate seaplanes while landplanes could continue to operate. In the 21st century, seaplanes maintain a few niche uses, such as for aerial firefighting, air transport around archipelagos, and access to undeveloped or roadless areas, some of which have numerous lakes.

Types 

The word "seaplane" is used to describe two types of air/water vehicles: the floatplane and the flying boat.
 
 A floatplane has slender floats, mounted under the fuselage. Two floats are common, but other configurations are possible. Only the floats of a floatplane normally come into contact with water. The fuselage remains above water. Some small land aircraft can be modified to become float planes, and in general, floatplanes are small aircraft. Floatplanes are limited by their inability to handle wave heights typically greater than 12 inches (0.31 m). These floats add to the empty weight of the airplane and to the drag coefficient, resulting in reduced payload capacity, slower rate of climb, and slower cruise speed.
 
 In a flying boat, the main source of buoyancy is the fuselage, which acts like a ship's hull in the water because the fuselage's underside has been hydrodynamically shaped to allow water to flow around it. Most flying boats have small floats mounted on their wings to keep them stable. Not all small seaplanes have been floatplanes, but most large seaplanes have been flying boats, with their great weight supported by their hulls.

The term "seaplane" is used by some instead of "floatplane". This is the standard British usage. This article treats both flying boats and floatplanes as types of seaplane, in the US fashion.

An amphibious aircraft can take off and land both on conventional runways and water. A true seaplane can only take off and land on water. There are amphibious flying boats and amphibious floatplanes, as well as some hybrid designs, e.g., floatplanes with retractable floats.

Modern (2019) production seaplanes range in size from flying-boat type light-sport aircraft amphibians, such as the Icon A5 and AirMax SeaMax, to the 100,000 lb ShinMaywa US-2 and Beriev Be-200 multi-role amphibians. Examples in between include the Dornier Seastar flying-boat type, 12-seat, utility amphibian and the Canadair CL-415 amphibious water-bomber. The Viking Air DHC-6 Twin Otter and Cessna Caravan utility aircraft have landing gear options which include amphibious floats.

History

Early pioneers

The Frenchman Alphonse Pénaud filed the first patent for a flying machine with a boat hull and retractable landing gear in 1876, but Austrian Wilhelm Kress is credited with building the first seaplane, Drachenflieger, in 1898, although its two  Daimler engines were inadequate for take-off, and it later sank when one of its two floats collapsed.

On 6 June 1905, Gabriel Voisin took off and landed on the River Seine with a towed kite glider on floats. He later built a powered floatplane in partnership with Louis Blériot, but the machine was unsuccessful.

Other pioneers also attempted to attach floats to aircraft in Britain, Australia, France and the United States.

On 28 March 1910, Frenchman Henri Fabre flew the first successful powered seaplane, the Gnome Omega-powered hydravion, a trimaran floatplane. Fabre's first successful take off and landing by a powered seaplane inspired other aviators, and he designed floats for several other flyers. The first hydro-aeroplane competition was held in Monaco in March 1912, featuring aircraft using floats from Fabre, Curtiss, Tellier and Farman. This led to the first scheduled seaplane passenger services, at Aix-les-Bains, using a five-seat Sanchez-Besa from 1 August 1912. The French Navy ordered its first floatplane in 1912. On May 10, 1912 Glenn L. Martin flew a homemade seaplane in California, setting records for distance and time. 

In 1911−12, François Denhaut constructed the first seaplane with a fuselage forming a hull, using various designs to give hydrodynamic lift at take-off. Its first successful flight was on 13 April 1912.
Throughout 1910 and 1911, American pioneering aviator Glenn Curtiss developed his floatplane into the successful Curtiss Model D land-plane, which used a larger central float and sponsons. Combining floats with wheels, he made the first amphibian flights in February 1911 and was awarded the first Collier Trophy for US flight achievement. From 1912, his experiments with a hulled seaplane resulted in the 1913 Model E and Model F, which he called "flying-boats". 
In February 1911, the United States Navy took delivery of the Curtiss Model E and soon tested landings on and take-offs from ships, using the Curtiss Model D.

In Britain, Captain Edward Wakefield and Oscar Gnosspelius began to explore the feasibility of flight from water in 1908. They decided to make use of Windermere in the Lake District, England's largest lake. The latter's first attempts to fly attracted large crowds, though the aircraft failed to take off and required a re-design of the floats incorporating features from the boat hulls of the lake's motor boat racing club member Isaac Borwick. Meanwhile, Wakefield ordered a floatplane similar to the design of the 1910 Fabre Hydravion. By November 1911, both Gnosspelius and Wakefield had aircraft capable of flight from water and awaited suitable weather conditions. Gnosspelius's flight was short-lived, as the aircraft crashed into the lake.

In Switzerland, Émile Taddéoli equipped the Dufaux 4 biplane with swimmers and successfully took off in 1912. A seaplane was used during the Balkan Wars in 1913, when a Greek "Astra Hydravion" did a reconnaissance of the Turkish fleet and dropped four bombs.

Birth of an industry
In 1913, the Daily Mail newspaper put up a £10,000 prize for the first non-stop aerial crossing of the Atlantic, which was soon "enhanced by a further sum" from the Women's Aerial League of Great Britain.

American businessman Rodman Wanamaker became determined that the prize should go to an American aircraft and commissioned the Curtiss Aeroplane and Motor Company to design and build an aircraft capable of making the flight. Curtiss's development of the Flying Fish flying boat in 1913 brought him into contact with John Cyril Porte, a retired Royal Navy Lieutenant, aircraft designer and test pilot who was to become an influential British aviation pioneer. Recognising that many of the early accidents were attributable to a poor understanding of handling while in contact with the water, the pair's efforts went into developing practical hull designs to make the transatlantic crossing possible.

The two years before World War I's breakout also saw the privately produced pair of Benoist XIV biplane flying boats, designed by Thomas W. Benoist, initiate the start of the first heavier-than-air airline service anywhere in the world, and the first airline service of any kind at all in the United States.

At the same time, the British boat-building firm J. Samuel White of Cowes on the Isle of Wight set up a new aircraft division and produced a flying boat in the United Kingdom. This was displayed at the London Air Show at Olympia in 1913. In that same year, a collaboration between the S. E. Saunders boatyard of East Cowes and the Sopwith Aviation Company produced the "Bat Boat", an aircraft with a consuta laminated hull that could operate from land or on water, which today is called an amphibious aircraft. The "Bat Boat" completed several landings on sea and on land and was duly awarded the Mortimer Singer Prize. It was the first all-British aeroplane capable of making six return flights over five miles within five hours.

In the US, Wanamaker's commission built on Glen Curtiss's previous development and experience with the Curtiss Model F for the U.S. Navy, which rapidly resulted in the America, designed under Porte's supervision following his study and rearrangement of the flight plan; the aircraft was a conventional biplane design with two-bay, unstaggered wings of unequal span with two pusher inline engines mounted side-by-side above the fuselage in the interplane gap. Wingtip pontoons were attached directly below the lower wings near their tips. The design (later developed into the Model H) resembled Curtiss's earlier flying boats but was built considerably larger so it could carry enough fuel to cover . The three crew members were accommodated in a fully enclosed cabin.

Trials of the America began 23 June 1914 with Porte also as Chief Test Pilot; testing soon revealed serious shortcomings in the design; it was under-powered, so the engines were replaced with more powerful tractor engines. There was also a tendency for the nose of the aircraft to try to submerge as engine power increased while taxiing on water. This phenomenon had not been encountered before, since Curtiss's earlier designs had not used such powerful engines nor large fuel/cargo loads and so were relatively more buoyant. In order to counteract this effect, Curtiss fitted fins to the sides of the bow to add hydrodynamic lift, but soon replaced these with sponsons, a type of underwater pontoon mounted in pairs on either side of a hull. These sponsons (or their engineering equivalents) and the flared, notched hull would remain a prominent feature of flying-boat hull design in the decades to follow. With the problem resolved, preparations for the crossing resumed. While the craft was found to handle "heavily" on takeoff, and required rather longer take-off distances than expected, the full moon on 5 August 1914 was selected for the trans-Atlantic flight; Porte was to pilot the America with George Hallett as co-pilot and mechanic.

World War I
Curtiss and Porte's plans were interrupted by the outbreak of World War I. Porte sailed for England on 4 August 1914 and rejoined the Navy as a member of the Royal Naval Air Service. Appointed Squadron Commander of Royal Navy Air Station Hendon, he soon convinced the Admiralty of the potential of flying boats and was put in charge of the naval air station at Felixstowe in 1915. Porte persuaded the Admiralty to commandeer (and later, purchase) the America and a sister craft from Curtiss. This was followed by an order for 12 more similar aircraft, one Model H-2 and the remaining as Model H-4s. Four examples of the latter were assembled in the UK by Saunders. All of these were similar to the design of the America and, indeed, were all referred to as Americas in Royal Navy service. The engines, however, were changed from the under-powered 160 hp Curtiss engines to 250 hp Rolls-Royce Falcon engines. The initial batch was followed by an order for 50 more (totalling 64 Americas overall during the war). Porte also acquired permission to modify and experiment with the Curtiss aircraft.

The Curtiss H-4s were soon found to have a number of problems; they were underpowered, their hulls were too weak for sustained operations, and they had poor handling characteristics when afloat or taking off.  One flying boat pilot, Major Theodore Douglas Hallam, wrote that they were "comic machines, weighing well under two tons; with two comic engines giving, when they functioned, 180 horsepower; and comic control, being nose heavy with engines on and tail heavy in a glide."

At Felixstowe, Porte made advances in flying-boat design and developed a practical hull design with the distinctive "Felixstowe notch".
Porte's first design to be implemented in Felixstowe was the Felixstowe Porte Baby, a large, three-engined biplane flying boat, powered by one central pusher and two outboard tractor Rolls-Royce Eagle engines.

Porte modified an H-4 with a new hull whose improved hydrodynamic qualities made taxiing, take-off and landing much more practical and called it the Felixstowe F.1.

Porte's innovation of the "Felixstowe notch" enabled the craft to overcome suction from the water more quickly and break free for flight much more easily. This made operating the craft far safer and more reliable. The "notch" breakthrough would soon after evolve into a "step", with the rear section of the lower hull sharply recessed above the forward lower hull section, and that characteristic became a feature of both flying-boat hulls and seaplane floats. The resulting aircraft would be large enough to carry sufficient fuel to fly long distances and could berth alongside ships to take on more fuel.

Porte then designed a similar hull for the larger Curtiss H-12 flying boat which, while larger and more capable than the H-4s, shared failings of a weak hull and poor water handling. The combination of the new Porte-designed hull, this time fitted with two steps, with the wings of the H-12 and a new tail, and powered by two Rolls-Royce Eagle engines, was named the Felixstowe F.2 and first flew in July 1916, proving greatly superior to the Curtiss on which it was based. It was used as the basis for all future designs. It entered production as the Felixstowe F.2A, being used as a patrol aircraft, with about 100 being completed by the end of World War I. Another seventy were built, and these were followed by two F.2c, which were built at Felixstowe.

In February 1917, the first prototype of the Felixstowe F.3 was flown. It was larger and heavier than the F.2, giving it greater range and heavier bomb load, but poorer agility. Approximately 100 Felixstowe F.3s were produced before the end of the war.

The Felixstowe F.5 was intended to combine the good qualities of the F.2 and F.3, with the prototype first flying in May 1918. The prototype showed superior qualities to its predecessors but, to ease production, the production version was modified to make extensive use of components from the F.3, which resulted in lower performance than the F.2A or F.5.

Porte's final design at the Seaplane Experimental Station was the 123-foot-span five-engined Felixstowe Fury triplane (also known as the "Porte Super-Baby" or "PSB").

F.2, F.3, and F.5 flying boats were extensively employed by the Royal Navy for coastal patrols and to search for German U-boats.
In 1918, they were towed on lighters towards the northern German ports to extend their range; on 4 June 1918, this resulted in three F.2As engaging in a dogfight with ten German seaplanes, shooting down two confirmed and four probables at no loss. As a result of this action, British flying boats were dazzle-painted to aid identification in combat.

The Curtiss Aeroplane and Motor Company independently developed its designs into the small Model F, the larger Model K (several of which were sold to the Russian Naval Air Service), and the Model C for the U.S. Navy. Curtiss, among others, also built the Felixstowe F.5 as the Curtiss F5L, based on the final Porte hull designs and powered by American Liberty engines.

Meanwhile, the pioneering flying-boat designs of François Denhaut had been steadily developed by the Franco-British Aviation Company into a range of practical craft. Smaller than the Felixstowes, several thousand FBAs served with almost all of the Allied forces as reconnaissance craft, patrolling the North Sea, Atlantic and Mediterranean Oceans.

In Italy, several seaplanes were developed, starting with the L series and progressing with the M series. The Macchi M.5, in particular, was extremely manoeuvrable and agile and matched the land-based aircraft it had to fight. Two hundred forty-four were built in total.
Towards the end of World War I, the aircraft were flown by Italian Navy Aviation, United States Navy and United States Marine Corps airmen. Ensign Charles Hammann won the first Medal of Honor awarded to a United States naval aviator in an M.5

The German aircraft manufacturing company Hansa-Brandenburg built flying boats starting with the model Hansa-Brandenburg GW in 1916, and had a degree of military success with their Hansa-Brandenburg W.12 two-seat floatplane fighter the following year, being the primary aircraft flown by Imperial Germany's maritime fighter ace, Friedrich Christiansen. The Austro-Hungarian firm Lohner-Werke began building flying boats, starting with the Lohner E in 1914 and the later (1915) widely copied Lohner L.

Between the wars

In September 1919, British company Supermarine started operating the first flying-boat service in the world, from Woolston to Le Havre in France, but it was short-lived.

A Curtiss NC-4 became the first airplane to fly across the Atlantic Ocean in 1919, crossing with multiple stops via the Azores. Of the four that made the attempt, only one completed the flight.

In 1923, the first successful commercial flying-boat service was introduced, with flights to and from the Channel Islands. After frequent appeals by the industry for subsidies, the Government decided that nationalization was necessary and ordered five aviation companies to merge to form the state-owned Imperial Airways of London (IAL). IAL became the international flag-carrying British airline, providing flying-boat passenger and mail-transport links between Britain and South Africa and India using aircraft such as the Short S.8 Calcutta.

In 1928, four Supermarine Southampton flying boats of the RAF Far East flight arrived in Melbourne, Australia. The flight was considered proof that flying boats had become a reliable means of long-distance transport.

In the 1930s, flying boats made it possible to have regular air transport between the U.S. and Europe, opening up new air travel routes to South America, Africa, and Asia.  Foynes, Ireland and Botwood, Newfoundland and Labrador were the terminals for many early transatlantic flights. In areas where there were no airfields for land-based aircraft, flying boats could stop at small river, lake or coastal stations to refuel and resupply. The Pan Am Boeing 314 "Clipper" flying boats brought new exotic destinations like the Far East within reach and came to represent the romance of flight.

By 1931, mail from Australia was reaching Britain in 16 days, or less than half the time taken by sea. In that year, government tenders on both sides of the world invited applications to run new passenger and mail services between the ends of the Empire, and Qantas and IAL were successful with a joint bid. A company under combined ownership was then formed, Qantas Empire Airways. The new ten-day service between  Rose Bay, New South Wales, (near Sydney) and Southampton was such a success that the volume of mail soon exceeded aircraft storage space.

A solution was found by the British government, who had requested Short Brothers to design a large long-range monoplane for IAL in 1933. Partner Qantas purchased six Short Empire flying boats.

Delivering the mail as quickly as possible generated a lot of competition and some innovative designs. One variant of the Short Empire flying boats was the strange-looking Maia and Mercury. It was a four-engined floatplane "Mercury" (the winged messenger) fixed on top of "Maia", a heavily modified Short Empire flying boat. The larger Maia took off, carrying the smaller Mercury loaded to a weight greater than it could take off with. This allowed the Mercury to carry sufficient fuel for a direct trans-Atlantic flight with the mail. Unfortunately, this was too complex, and the Mercury had to be returned from America by ship. The Mercury did set some distance records before in-flight refuelling was adopted.

Sir Alan Cobham devised a method of in-flight refuelling in the 1930s. In the air, the Short Empire could be loaded with more fuel than it could take off with. Short Empire flying boats serving the trans-Atlantic crossing were refueled over Foynes; with the extra fuel load, they could make a direct trans-Atlantic flight. A Handley Page H.P.54 Harrow was used as the fuel tanker.

The German Dornier Do X flying boat was noticeably different from its UK and U.S.-built counterparts. It had wing-like protrusions from the fuselage, called sponsons, to stabilize it on the water without the need for wing-mounted outboard floats. This feature was pioneered by Claudius Dornier during World War I on his Dornier Rs. I giant flying boat and perfected on the Dornier Wal in 1924. The enormous Do X was powered by 12 engines and carried 170 people. It flew across the Atlantic to the Americas in 1929, It was the largest flying boat of its time, but was severely underpowered and was limited by a very low operational ceiling. Only three were built, with a variety of different engines installed, in an attempt to overcome the lack of power. Two of these were sold to Italy.

World War II

The military value of flying boats was well-recognized, and every country bordering on water operated them in a military capacity at the outbreak of the war. They were utilized in various tasks from anti-submarine patrol to air-sea rescue and gunfire spotting for battleships. Aircraft such as the PBM Mariner patrol bomber, PBY Catalina, Short Sunderland, and Grumman Goose recovered downed airmen and operated as scout aircraft over the vast distances of the Pacific Theater and Atlantic. They also sank numerous submarines and found enemy ships. In May 1941, the German battleship Bismarck was discovered by a PBY Catalina flying out of Castle Archdale Flying boat base, Lower Lough Erne, Northern Ireland.

The largest flying boat of the war was the Blohm & Voss BV 238, which was also the heaviest plane to fly during World War II and the largest aircraft built and flown by any of the Axis Powers.

In November 1939, IAL was restructured into three separate companies: British European Airways, British Overseas Airways Corporation (BOAC), and British South American Airways (which merged with BOAC in 1949), with the change being made official on 1 April 1940. BOAC continued to operate flying-boat services from the (slightly) safer confines of Poole Harbour during wartime, returning to Southampton in 1947. When Italy entered the war in June 1940, the Mediterranean was closed to Allied planes and BOAC and Qantas operated the Horseshoe Route between Durban and Sydney using Short Empire flying boats.

The Martin Company produced the prototype XPB2M Mars based on their PBM Mariner patrol bomber, with flight tests between 1941 and 1943. The Mars was converted by the Navy into a transport aircraft designated the XPB2M-1R. Satisfied with the performance, twenty of the modified JRM-1 Mars were ordered. The first, named Hawaii Mars, was delivered in June 1945, but the Navy scaled back their order at the end of World War II, buying only the five aircraft which were then on the production line. The five Mars were completed, and the last delivered in 1947.

Post-War

After World War II, the use of flying boats rapidly declined for several reasons. The ability to land on water became less of an advantage owing to the considerable increase in the number and length of land-based runways during World War II. Further, as the speed and range of land-based aircraft increased, the commercial competitiveness of flying boats diminished; their design compromised aerodynamic efficiency and speed to accomplish the feat of waterborne takeoff and landing. Competing with new civilian jet aircraft like the de Havilland Comet and Boeing 707 proved impossible.

The Hughes H-4 Hercules, in development in the U.S. during the war, was even larger than the BV 238, but it did not fly until 1947. The "Spruce Goose", as the 180-ton H-4 was nicknamed, was the largest flying boat ever to fly. Cutbacks in expenditure after the war and the disappearance of its intended mission as a transatlantic transport left it no purpose.

In 1944, the Royal Air Force began development of a small jet-powered flying boat that it intended to use as an air defence aircraft optimised for the Pacific, where the relatively calm sea conditions around the many archipelagos made the use of seaplanes easier. By making the aircraft jet-powered, it was possible to design it with a hull rather than making it a floatplane. The Saunders-Roe SR.A/1 prototype first flew in 1947 and was relatively successful in terms of its performance and handling. However, by the end of the war, carrier-based aircraft were becoming more sophisticated, and the need for the SR.A/1 evaporated.

During the Berlin Airlift (which lasted from June 1948 until August 1949), ten Sunderlands and two Hythes were used to transport goods from Finkenwerder on the Elbe near Hamburg to isolated Berlin, landing on the Havelsee beside RAF Gatow until it iced over. The Sunderlands were particularly used for transporting salt, as their airframes were already protected against corrosion from seawater. Transporting salt in standard aircraft risked rapid and severe structural corrosion in the event of a spillage. In addition, three Aquila flying boats were used during the airlift. This is the only known operational use of flying boats within central Europe.

The U.S. Navy continued to operate flying boats (notably the Martin P5M Marlin) until the early 1970s. The Navy even built a jet-powered seaplane bomber, the Martin Seamaster.

BOAC ceased flying boat services out of Southampton in November 1950.

Bucking the trend, in 1948, Aquila Airways was founded to serve destinations that were still inaccessible to land-based aircraft. This company operated Short S.25 and Short S.45 flying boats out of Southampton on routes to Madeira, Las Palmas, Lisbon, Jersey, Majorca, Marseille, Capri, Genoa, Montreux and Santa Margherita. From 1950 to 1957, Aquila also operated a service from Southampton to Edinburgh and Glasgow.  The flying boats of Aquila Airways were also chartered for one-off trips, usually to deploy troops where scheduled services did not exist or where there were political considerations. The longest charter, in 1952, was from Southampton to the Falkland Islands. In 1953, the flying boats were chartered for troop-deployment trips to Freetown and Lagos, and there was a special trip from Hull to Helsinki to relocate a ship's crew. The airline ceased operations on 30 September 1958.

The technically advanced Saunders-Roe Princess first flew in 1952 and later received a certificate of airworthiness. Despite being the pinnacle of flying-boat development, none were sold, though  Aquila Airways reportedly attempted to buy them. Of the three Princesses that were built, two never flew, and all were scrapped in 1967. In the late 1940s, Saunders-Roe also produced the jet-powered SR.A/1 flying-boat fighter, which did not progress beyond flying prototypes.

Ansett Australia operated a flying-boat service from Rose Bay to Lord Howe Island until 1974, using Short Sandringhams.

On 18 December 1990, Pilot Tom Casey completed the first round-the-world flight in a floatplane with only water landings using a Cessna 206 named Liberty II.

Uses and operation

Many modern civilian aircraft have a floatplane variant, usually as utility transports to lakes and other remote areas. Most of these are offered as third-party modifications under a supplemental type certificate (STC), although there are several aircraft manufacturers that build floatplanes from scratch, and a few that continue to build flying boats. Some older flying boats remain in service for firefighting duty, as well as the Canadair CL-415 which remains in production as of 2022, and Chalk's Ocean Airways operated a fleet of Grumman Mallards in passenger service until service was suspended after a crash on December 19, 2005, which was linked to maintenance, not to design of the aircraft. Purely water-based seaplanes have largely been supplanted by amphibious aircraft.
Seaplanes can only take off and land on water with little or no wave action and, like other aircraft, have trouble in extreme weather. The size of waves a given design can withstand depends on, among other factors, the aircraft's size, hull or float design, and its weight, all making for a much more unstable aircraft, limiting actual operational days. 
Flying boats can typically handle rougher water and are generally more stable than floatplanes while on the water.

Seaplanes are also used in remote areas such as the Alaskan and Canadian wilderness, especially in areas with a large number of lakes convenient for takeoff and landing. They may operate on a charter basis, provide scheduled service, or be operated by residents of the area for personal use. There are seaplane operators that offer services between islands such as in the Caribbean Sea or the Maldives.

See also

 List of flying boats and floatplanes
 Ground effect vehicle
 IAR 111
 Observation seaplane
 Seaplane tender

References

External link